The province of Siena is a province in Tuscany, Italy. Its capital is the city of Siena.

Geography 
The province is divided into seven historical areas:
 Alta Val d'Elsa
 Chianti senese
 The urban area of (Monteriggioni and Siena)
 Val di Merse
 Crete senesi Val d'Arbia
 Val di Chiana senese
 Val d'Orcia and Amiata

To the west are the Colline Metallifere (“Metalliferous Hills”), whilst the Val di Chiana lies to east.  

Historically, the province corresponds to the northeastern portion of the former Republic of Siena.

The chief occupations are agricultural (wheat, grapes and fruit) and silk culture. The wine known as Chianti is produced here as well as in other parts of Tuscany: the Chianti Colli Senesi, however, is limited to this province.

Apart from the city of Siena the principal towns are Poggibonsi, Colle di Val d'Elsa, Montepulciano, Chiusi, and San Gimignano.

Comuni 
There are 35 comuni (singular: comune) in the province .

The main comuni by population, are:

This is the complete list of comuni in the province of Siena:

 Abbadia San Salvatore
 Asciano
 Buonconvento
 Casole d'Elsa
 Castellina in Chianti
 Castelnuovo Berardenga
 Castiglione d'Orcia
 Cetona
 Chianciano Terme
 Chiusdino
 Chiusi
 Colle di Val d'Elsa
 Gaiole in Chianti
 Montalcino
 Montepulciano
 Monteriggioni
 Monteroni d'Arbia
 Monticiano
 Murlo
 Piancastagnaio
 Pienza
 Poggibonsi
 Radda in Chianti
 Radicofani
 Radicondoli
 Rapolano Terme
 San Casciano dei Bagni
 San Gimignano 
 San Quirico d'Orcia
 Sarteano
 Siena
 Sinalunga
 Sovicille
 Torrita di Siena
 Trequanda

Government

List of presidents of the province of Siena

External links 

 Official website 

 
S
Siena